Jharul is a village in Bhatar CD block in Bardhaman Sadar North subdivision of Purba Bardhaman district in the state of West Bengal, India with total 580 families residing.

History
Census 2011 Jharul Village Location Code or Village Code 319790. The village of Jharul is located in the Bhatar tehsil of Burdwan district in West Bengal, India.

Transport 

Population 
Schedule Tribe (ST) constitutes 8.64% while Schedule Caste (SC) were 6.37% of total population in Jharul village.

Population and house data

Healthcare
Nearest Rural Hospital at Bhatar (with 60 beds) is the main medical facility in Bhatar CD block. There are primary health centers..

School
JHARUL F.P. SCHOOL.

References 

Villages in Purba Bardhaman district
West Bengal articles missing geocoordinate data